Little Fugitive may refer to:

Little Fugitive (1953 film), American feature with non-professional actors
Little Fugitive (2006 film), American remake of 1953 film